Lagarrigue is a commune in the Tarn, department in southern France.

Inhabitants are called "Lagarriguois".

History 
The commune is quoted in 1272 in a charter of Gaix's castle. In 1629, Louis de Cardaillac created an independent consulate in the town.

Economy 
There is a part of Castres-Mazamet airport on the commune.

Monuments

Personalities 

 Claude Puel, a French football player and manager ;
 Guillaume Borne, a French football player.

See also
Communes of the Tarn department

References

Communes of Tarn (department)